The master leaf-eared mouse (Phyllotis magister) is a species of rodent in the family Cricetidae. 
It is found in Chile and Peru.

References

 Baillie, J. 1996.  Phyllotis magister.   2006 IUCN Red List of Threatened Species.   Downloaded on 9 July 2007.
Musser, G. G. and M. D. Carleton. 2005. Superfamily Muroidea. pp. 894–1531 in Mammal Species of the World a Taxonomic and Geographic Reference. D. E. Wilson and D. M. Reeder eds. Johns Hopkins University Press, Baltimore.

Mammals of Chile
Mammals of Peru
Phyllotis
Mammals described in 1912
Taxa named by Oldfield Thomas
Taxonomy articles created by Polbot